Cheapside is a street in London, England.

Cheapside may also refer to:

Cheapside, Berkshire, a village close to Ascot in Berkshire, England
Cheapside, Glasgow, a street in Glasgow, Scotland
Cheapside Street Whisky Bond Fire, A major fire which occurred in 1960
Cheapside, Hertfordshire, England (in Anstey parish)
Cheapside, Ontario, Canada
Cheapside, Texas, United States
Cheapside, Virginia, United States
A neighborhood of Greenfield, Massachusetts, United States
Cheapside Park, the former name of a park in downtown Lexington, Kentucky, United States